Jhanjhaar (Fire) is a 1987 Hindi social drama film directed by V. Shantaram. Made under Rajkamal Kalamandir banner it was a V. Shantaram Productions film. It had music by Kalyanji Anandji. The film starred Sushant Ray (Shantaram's grandson), with Padmini Kolhapure, and the rest of the cast included Yunus Parvez, Sudhir Pandey and Ranjana Deshmukh (niece of Hindi film actress Sandhya who was V. Shantaram's wife). Ranjana's career came to a halt when she met with a car accident on the way to the shooting of this film in Bangalore.

Culminating the end of a career that "spanned"  nearly seventy years in Indian cinema, Jhanjhaar  was Shantaram's last released film, and a commercial failure at the box-office. Shantaram was 85 years at the time of making Jhanjhaar.

The film is set in a village where a man claiming to be a freedom-fighter takes advantage of the villagers for his own evil purposes. The story then follows the rise of the villagers against him.

Plot
Pushpa and Gayatri are the daughters of an ex-army man, Veer Bahadur, now retired to his village. He fights against the atrocities inflicted by Nagoji, a man pretending to be a freedom fighter. Nagoji uses this as a way of fuelling wrongdoings in the village. When Veer Bahadur opposes Nagoji, he is killed. Bahadur’s daughters vow to avenge their father and save the village from Nagoji. They are helped by Nagoji's son, Santosh, who despises the evil ways of his father and more so when Nagoji attempts to molest Pushpa. Gayatri, Pushpa and Santosh together with the help of the villagers manage to bring an end to Nagoji’s wicked ways.

Cast
 Sushant Ray
 Padmini Kolhapure
 Ranjana Deshmukh
 Sudhir Pandey
 Yunus Pervez

Soundtrack
The music was composed by Kalyanji–Anandji and released by Sony Music India. All lyrics were penned by Vishwamitra Adil.

References

External links

1987 films
1980s Hindi-language films
Films directed by V. Shantaram
1980s Marathi-language films
Indian multilingual films